József Piller (born 16 August 1988 in Budapest) is a retired Hungarian football forward player who last played for Vasas SC.

External links

1988 births
Living people
Footballers from Budapest
Hungarian footballers
Association football defenders
Vasas SC players
BFC Siófok players
SC Veendam players
Egri FC players
Nemzeti Bajnokság I players
Hungarian expatriate footballers
Expatriate footballers in the Netherlands
Hungarian expatriate sportspeople in the Netherlands